Max Webster was the first record released by Canadian rock band Max Webster. The record was released in 1976 on Taurus Records, a short-lived label created by Rush manager Ray Danniels. The album was re-issued in January 1977 by Anthem Records in Canada and on Mercury Records in the US, with the title Hangover and different artwork.

Max Webster was certified gold in 1979 by the Canadian Recording Industry Association.

Track listing
All songs written by Kim Mitchell and Pye Dubois, except where indicated
Side one
 "Hangover" – 4:36
 "Here Among the Cats" – 3:07
 "Blowing the Blues Away" (Terry Watkinson) – 3:33
 "Summer Turning Blue" – 3:05
 "Toronto Tontos" – 3:40

Side two
 "Coming Off the Moon" – 3:38
 "Only Your Nose Knows" – 4:16
 "Summer's Up" – 2:45
 "Lily" (Mitchell) – 7:42

Personnel
Max Webster
Kim Mitchell – guitars and lead vocals
Terry Watkinson – keyboards and vocals, cover art and design
Mike Tilka – bass and vocals
Paul Kersey – drums and percussion
Pye Dubois – lyrics

Production
Terry Brown – producer, engineer
Tom Berry – executive producer
Ray Danniels, Vic Wilson (SRO Productions Inc.) – management
Jon Erickson, Robert Gunn – road crew

References

1976 debut albums
Max Webster albums
Anthem Records albums
Albums produced by Terry Brown (record producer)